Avra Valley (O'odham: Ko:jĭ Pi Bak) is a census-designated place (CDP) in Pima County, Arizona, United States. The population was 6,050 at the 2010 census, up from 5,038 in 2000.

Geography
Avra Valley is located at  (32.418704, -111.328028).

Climate 

Avra Valley has a hot desert climate (Köppen climate classification: BWh).

Demographics

Avra Valley first appeared on the 1990 U.S. Census as a census-designated place (CDP).

At the 2000 census there were 5,038 people, 1,714 households, and 1,311 families living in the CDP. The racial makeup of the CDP was 84.0% White, 1.8% Black or African American, 1.7% Native American, 0.4% Asian, <0.1% Pacific Islander, 9.7% from other races, and 2.4% from two or more races.  20.7% of the population were Hispanic or Latino of any race.
Of the 1,714 households 38.0% had children under the age of 18 living with them, 58.0% were married couples living together, 12.0% had a female householder with no husband present, and 23.5% were non-families. 17.8% of households were one person and 5.7% were one person aged 65 or older.  The average household size was 2.94 and the average family size was 3.30.

The age distribution was 31.5% under the age of 18, 7.6% from 18 to 24, 29.3% from 25 to 44, 22.5% from 45 to 64, and 9.2% 65 or older.  The median age was 34 years. For every 100 females, there were 104.9 males.  For every 100 females age 18 and over, there were 102.3 males.

The median household income was $35,459 and the median family income  was $36,981. Males had a median income of $30,643 versus $20,110 for females. The per capita income for the CDP was $13,175.  About 9.0% of families and 11.5% of the population were below the poverty line, including 12.8% of those under age 18 and 5.6% of those age 65 or over.

References

Census-designated places in Pima County, Arizona
Populated places in the Sonoran Desert